The Weller River (French: Rivière Weller) is a tributary left bank of the Blanche River whose confluence is found east of the village of Saint-Ubalde, in the Portneuf Regional County Municipality, in the administrative region of Capitale-Nationale, in the province of Quebec in Canada.

Forestry is the main economic activity in the upper part of this hydrographic slope; agriculture, in the lower part.

The surface of the Sainte-Anne river (except the rapids areas) is generally frozen from the beginning of December to the end of March; however, safe circulation on the ice is generally done from the end of December to the beginning of March.

Geography 
The Weller River rises at Lac Carillon which straddles the boundary of the municipalities of Saint-Ubalde and Notre-Dame-de-Montauban. The resort developed in certain segments of the northwest and southwest shores of the lake because of Enchanted Street (north shore) and Chemin des Ballades (southwest shore). The mouth of the lake is located at the bottom of a small bay southwest of the lake.

  east to a bend in the river;
  to the south by crossing a small area of marshland, then crossing Lac Sept Îles over its full length towards the southwest, to its mouth;
  to the south by collecting the discharge (coming from the west) from two small unidentified lakes, then crossing Lake Weller on  until at its mouth;
  towards the south-west first passing under the bridge of Stridor road, forming some serpentines, to the outlet (coming from the west) of a small lake not identified;
  towards the south-east, meandering through an agricultural plain to the bridge on chemin du rang Saint-Joseph;
  towards the south-east, meandering through an agricultural plain to its mouth.

The Weller River flows into a bend on the north bank of the Blanche River. This confluence is located at:
  north-west of the confluence of the Noire river and the Blanche river ;
  north-west of the confluence of the Noire River and Sainte-Anne River in the village of Saint-Casimir;
  east of the village center of Saint-Ubalde.

Toponymy 
The term "Weller" is a surname of German origin.

The toponym "Rivière Weller" was registered with the Place names bank of the Commission de toponymie du Québec on May 5, 1981.

See also 

 Blanche River
 Noire River
 Saint-Ubalde
 Lac Sept-Îles (Saint-Ubalde)
 Portneuf Regional County Municipality
 List of rivers of Quebec

Notes and references

Bibliography

External links 
 

Rivers of Capitale-Nationale